NationStates (formerly Jennifer Government: NationStates) is a multiplayer government simulation browser game created and developed by Max Barry. Based loosely on the novel Jennifer Government, the game was publicly released on 13 November 2002 with the site originally founded as an independent vehicle publicizing the novel one week before its release. NationStates continues to promote books written by Barry, but has developed to be a sizable online community, with an accompanying forum board. Since its launch, over 8.37 million user-created nations have been created, with around 314,789 being active as of 18 February 2023.

History 

NationStates, then named Jennifer Government: NationStates, was launched on 13 November 2002 by Australian novelist Max Barry to help promote the sale of his novel Jennifer Government,  which NationStates is loosely based on, prior to its release. Although NationStates launched in November 2002, Barry worked on beta versions of the game as early as 7 August 2002. Barry has stated that he was influenced to create the website after he took a multiple-choice political quiz to determine a person's political affiliations, adding that "it was fun, but I also wanted to see what kind of country my policies created, and have to deal with the consequences".

On 21 January 2008, Barry received a cease and desist letter from the United Nations (UN) for unauthorized usage of its name and emblem for the game's fictional international organization which was based on the UN. As a result, Barry changed the name of the organization to the "World Assembly", introducing the changes as an April Fool's prank. Barry joked about the situation, stating "it's the place where players come together to debate and pass international law; in the five years the game has been running, they’ve implemented privacy safeguards, promoted religious tolerance, passed a universal bill of rights, and outlawed child labor, amongst 240 other resolutions [...] Clearly this wasn't anything the real UN wanted to be associated with".

Gameplay 

Players register by setting up their nation through answering a short questionnaire which determines the type of government the nation will have. Players can determine their nation's name, flag, motto, currency, animal, capital, leader, and faith. The gameplay hinges on the player deciding government policies through "issues" which are presented to the player multiple times each day. Issues are written by either Barry or by the players themselves with moderator editing. The player may choose from a list of options or dismiss the issue. The player's responses may affect the nation's status across three main statistics: political freedom, civil rights, and economy, and based on these main statistics, the nation is assigned to one of twenty-seven government classifications.

Players can also choose to join the World Assembly, a United Nations-like voluntary body concerned with the drafting and passage of international law. It has two separate chambers: the General Assembly and the Security Council. The General Assembly is concerned with passing legislation on various topics, while the Security Council recognizes various nations and regions for good or bad deeds. Players spawn in one of five "Pacific" regions (North, South, East, West, and just the 'Pacific'), but they can then move to different regions, which are a community function similar to a chat room. Users can create their own regions. NationStates does not have a win condition.

While NationStates lacks a mechanic for war between nations, it is possible to invade and take over other regions by exploiting a World Assembly mechanic. Every nation in the World Assembly can "endorse" other World Assembly members in their region, and the nation with the highest number of endorsements in a region becomes the World Assembly Delegate, who is responsible for approving proposals for voting in the World Assembly and can hold other permissions within a region. Players can seize control in a region by becoming its World Assembly Delegate in gameplay known as "raiding/defending" or "R/D".

NationStates has an active forum board. The board was hosted from 2004 to 2009 by Jolt Online Gaming, before being self-hosted when Jolt was acquired by OMAC Holdings. There are a variety of categories in which many topics can be found. As of January 2023, approximately 32 million posts have been made within approximately 430,000 forum threads, with just over 1.7 million users being registered.

Reception

Critical reception 

In the 2009 book The Video Game Theory Reader 2, Lars Konzack critiqued that NationStates promoted libertarianism, but also stated that it is "open to experimentation and reflection on politics rather than being merely political propaganda. It becomes a philosophical game in which the player is invited to become part of an examination of political ideas. This game takes advantage of the potential in games to truly put the player in control and let him reflect on his own decisions, investigating political theory turned into meaningful game aesthetics." In the 2008 book The Art and Science of Interface and Interaction Design, C. Paul said that NationStates is "an interesting take on the interplay of freedom and control (and governance without government)".

Jay Is Games Jerrad praised the game, stating "the real beauty in this game is that it's accessible on so many levels". ProgrammableWebs Kevin Sundstrom listed NationStates among its "30 New APIs", remarking that its application programming interface (API) "provides a developer interface for automate game world data collection".

Popularity 

The game attracted a thousand players within two weeks, and had 20,700 by the end of the first year. Barry was surprised by the popularity of the game, and saw its discussion forums developing into an arena for political debate. He was impressed by some of the activity in the forums, relating how "one nation accused another of conducting secret missile tests and posted photos to prove it. That escalated into an international crisis that was only solved by sending in teams of independent weapons inspectors". In December 2016, Alexa Internet ranked NationStates as the 14,380th most visited website.

See also 

 List of Internet forums
 Online games
 The Political Compass

References

Further reading

External links 

 Official website
 Forum board

2002 video games
Browser games
Fictional governments
Government simulation video games
Massively multiplayer online role-playing games
Browser-based multiplayer online games
Video games developed in Australia
Political video games